"Never Too Late" is a song written and produced by British production team Stock, Aitken and Waterman for Australian singer Kylie Minogue's second studio album, Enjoy Yourself (1989). Released on 23 October 1989, the song peaked at number four on the UK Singles Chart, number one in Ireland, and number 14 in Australia. It was later rerecorded for Minogue's orchestral compilation album, The Abbey Road Sessions, in 2012.

Background and release
Minogue allegedly wanted the album title track "Enjoy Yourself" to be released as the third single from that album, but Pete Waterman overruled her request and "Never Too Late" was released instead on 23 October 1989. The song debuted at number 17 on the UK Singles Chart and rose to its peak of number four the following week. Its low debut broke Minogue's run of seven consecutive top-two hits, but it became her eighth consecutive top-five hit single and was certified silver by the British Phonographic Industry (BPI) for sales over 200,000.

B-side
Called "Kylie's Smiley Mix", the B-side is a continuous mix of her biggest hits from the Kylie album, and the 12-inch version includes these songs in sequence order: "I'll Still Be Loving You", "It's No Secret", "Je ne sais pas pourquoi", "Turn It into Love", "I Should Be So Lucky", "Got to Be Certain", and the whistle from the beginning of the 1988 mix of "The Loco-Motion". The 7-inch mix contains the above tracks omitting "I'll Still Be Loving You" and "It's No Secret".

Music video
Directed by Pete Cornish, the video showed Minogue in various costumes with her dancers in front of various backdrops – some of the costumes are as a cowgirl, '70s disco, Chinese dress with fans and as a 1920s flapper. It was awarded the Logie for the "Most Popular Music Video" at the 32nd Annual TV week Logie Awards held in 1990 in Australia.

Live performances

Since its release, "Never Too Late" has only been performed on four of Minogue's tours. Its first appearance was in the Enjoy Yourself Tour. It featured a small dance before hand and then the original. Its next performance was not for 11 years when Minogue performed it on her On a Night Like This Tour in 2001, which was launched to promote Light Years. It was performed as part of "Hits Medley" which featured 5 songs from her PWL days: "Step Back in Time", "Never Too Late", "Wouldn't Change a Thing", "Turn It into Love" and "Celebration" respectively. It was then set to be part of her KylieFever2002 set list as a space age version to feature as the opening to the act entitled "Cybertronica", but was removed at the last minute. It made an appearance on Minogue's Kiss Me Once Tour in 2014. It featured in the "Dollshouse Medley" which featured four songs from her PWL days: "Hand on Your Heart", "Never Too Late", "Got to Be Certain" and "I Should Be So Lucky" respectively. In this segment of the show, Minogue began in a pink shawl and took a layer off at the beginning of each song, before ending in a corset and knickers to sing "I Should Be So Lucky" in a bath, alluding to a scene in the song's music video. More recently, it is performed on her Summer 2019 Tour.

Formats and track listings
CD single
 "Never Too Late" – 3:21
 "Never Too Late" (extended) – 6:11
 "Kylie's Smiley Mix" (extended) – 6:17

7-inch single
 "Never Too Late" – 3:21
 "Kylie's Smiley Mix" (7-inch version) – 3:59

12-inch single
 "Never Too Late" (extended) – 6:11
 "Kylie's Smiley Mix" (extended) – 6:17

Australian 7-inch single
 "Never Too Late" – 3:21
 "Made in Heaven" (Heaven Scent Mix) – 4:43

Australian 12-inch and cassette single
 "Never Too Late" (extended) – 6:11
 "Made in Heaven" (Heaven Scent Mix) – 4:43

Charts

Weekly charts

Year-end charts

Certifications

References

Kylie Minogue songs
1989 singles
1989 songs
Pete Waterman Entertainment singles
Song recordings produced by Stock Aitken Waterman
Songs written by Matt Aitken
Songs written by Mike Stock (musician)
Songs written by Pete Waterman